Micropia is the name of a family of LTR retrotransposons widespread in the genomes of fruitflies of the genus Drosophila. Micropia retrotransposons in some species of Drosophila express a male germline-specific and meiotic-specific antisense transcript complementary to the reverse transcriptase (RT) and ribonuclease A (RNaseA) genes of the proviral retrotransposon. No active transposition of micropia has been registered so far. micropia is likely part of a selfish driver system responsible for the Drosophila Y chromosomal lampbrushloop evolution in some species.

Micropia was discovered after micro-cloning experiments carried out on Y-chromosomal lampbrush loops by Prof. Wolfgang Hennig. Similar loops can be found in lampbrush chromosomes (see Lampbrush chromosome) that are characteristic for the female germ cells of most animals, except mammals. The name micropia is an artificial word, i.e. a concoction of "microcloning" and "copia-like element".

References

Burt, A., and R. Trivers. 2006. Genes in Conflict. The Belknap Press of Harvard University Press, Cambridge, Ma; London.

Mobile genetic elements